Dorsey is an unincorporated community in Madison County, Illinois, United States. Dorsey has a post office with ZIP code 62021.

History
A post office has been in operation at Dorsey since 1857. The community bears the name of Samuel L. Dorsey, a local pioneer.

References

Unincorporated communities in Madison County, Illinois
Unincorporated communities in Illinois
1857 establishments in Illinois
Populated places established in 1857